According to the 2011 census Kottayam district has a population of 1,979,384,  This gives it a ranking of 234th in India (out of a total of 640). Its population growth rate over the decade 2001–11 was 1.32%. Kottayam has a sex ratio of 1040 females for every 1000 males, and a literacy rate of 96.4%.

As per 2011 Indian Census, population in Kottayam includes Hindus (49.81%), Christians (43.48%) and Muslims (6.41%).

Religion 

Hindus, Christians and Muslims form a significant part of the population. In 2011 Indian Census Muslim Population is 6.41%, Hindu 49.81%, Christian 43.48%.
Kottayam, Thiruvalla and Chengannur are the railway stations for pilgrims heading to the Hindu holy site of Sabarimala.

Kottayam is a major center for Saint Thomas Christians in Kerala. Syrian Christians include Syro-Malabar Catholic, Jacobite Syrian Christian Church (Jacobite), Knanaya, Syro-Malankara Catholic, Malankara Mar Thoma Syrian Church,  and other members of  Malankara Orthodox and Madhya Kerala Diocese of the Church of South India.

According to CDS Data   About 54% of Kottayam Christians are Syro-Malabar Catholic , 8.8% are Jacobite Syrian Christian Church (Jacobite), 6.9% are Syro-Malankara Catholic,  5.5% are Malankara Orthodox, 3.4% are Malankara Mar Thoma Syrian Church.
Among Protestant's CSI church is the largest denomination in the district with over 150,000 believers. Protestants in Kottayam include Pentecost churches. A number of old and sacred Christian churches are also located in Kottayam.

References

People from Kottayam district